Old Bet (died July 24, 1816) was the first circus elephant and the second elephant brought to the United States. There are reports of an elephant brought to the United States in 1796, but it is not known for certain that this was the elephant that was later named Old Bet.

Biography
The first elephant brought to the United States was in 1796, aboard the America which set sail from Calcutta for New York on December 3, 1795.  
However, it is not certain that this was Old Bet. The first references to Old Bet start in 1804 in Boston as part of a menagerie. In 1808, while residing in Somers, New York, Hachaliah Bailey purchased the menagerie elephant for $1,000 and named it "Old Bet".

On July 24, 1816, Old Bet was killed while on tour near Alfred, Maine by local farmer Daniel Davis who shot her, and was later convicted of the crime. While many people believe that the farmer thought it was sinful for people to pay to see an animal, another suspected reason is jealousy.

Legacy
In 1821, the Scudder's American Museum in New York announced that they had bought the hide and bones of Old Bet and would mount the remains at the museum. The elephant was memorialized in 1825 with a statue and the Elephant Hotel in Somers, New York. In 1922 the elephant John L. Sullivan walked 53 miles to lay a wreath for the memory of Old Bet at her memorial statue.

See also
 List of individual elephants

References

Further reading

External links
"First Circus Elephant" (video) — Old Bet, featured on a segment of Monumental Mysteries, (originally aired: 25 July 2013 on Travel Channel)

1816 animal deaths
Individual elephants
Year of birth missing
Place of birth missing
Circus animals